Aavikko is a Finnish synth music band, formed in Siilinjärvi in 1995. Their hallmarks include a campy, decidedly "East European" style and plastic-sounding synthesizer themes. The band themselves call their style "muysic" (a portmanteau of "mystic" and "music"); their motto is "We play - you dance!".

One of their most famous songs is "Viitostie", which is strongly influenced by Kraftwerk (the name is a reference to "Autobahn": "Viitostie" is a highway in Finland that passes through Siilinjärvi).

Members
Tomi Kosonen, keyboards and saxophone
Tomi Leppänen, drums and electric percussion (Leppänen is also a member of Circle, Pharaoh Overlord and K-X-P)
Paul Staufenbiel, keyboards (1998-)
Former members
Antti Koivumäki (b. 1976, d. 2002), electric organ (1995-1998)
Jimi Vesikko, technical work.

Discography
 Aavikko 7-inch EP/MCD (Bad Vugum, 1996)
 Derek! LP/CD (Bad Vugum, 1997)
 Oriental Baby EP (1999)
 Multi Muysic (2000)
 Viitostie EP (2000)
 Aavikko & Felix Kubin EP (2001)
 Aavikko & Mono Pause EP (2002)
 History of Muysic (collection, 2003)
 Meets Hit Singer Kabar (single, 2004)
 Back from the Futer (2005)
 Novo Atlantis (2009)
 Planet Fun-Fun (mini-LP, 2013)
 Monopoly (2019)

External links
 

Finnish musical groups
Musical groups established in 1995